The Little Museum of Dublin is a local history museum situated at St Stephen's Green, Dublin, Ireland. The museum is located in an 18th-century Georgian townhouse owned by Dublin City Council.

Collection
As a local history museum for the city of Dublin, the Little Museum chronicles the history of the city in the 20th century. It provides visitors with information on life in Dublin during that time period. The Little Museum, the "brainchild" of director Trevor White and curator Simon O’Connor, was formed in April 2011 and officially opened its doors to the public in October of the same year. A registered charity, the museum is governed by a board that includes representatives of Dublin City Council and Fáilte Ireland, the national tourism development authority.

The museum has a collection of over 5,000 artefacts that have been donated or loaned directly from the people of Dublin. It has three floors of exhibition space in the Georgian townhouse and one floor for office space. Exhibitions in the museum include displays covering the 1916 Rising, U.S. President John F. Kennedy's visit to Dublin, and many other events in Irish political and social history. In 2014 the museum opened an exhibit that focuses on the rock band U2.

The museum also offers "I Love Dublin" classes for school children ages 6–17, and a tourist greeter program, City of a Thousand Welcomes. The program is a "civic initiative" that connects first-time visitors to Dublin with a local 'ambassador' who welcomes them by taking them out for a cup of tea or a pint. During the outing, the ambassadors tell their guests about the city.

In 2014, the museum purchased an archive of work by artist and poet Christy Brown. As of 19 March 2014, the Little Museum and the National Library of Ireland were the proud joint owners of a collection that includes private letters and previously unseen sketches, paintings, and poems. The collection was sold by Bonhams in London for nearly 45,000 euro.

Patrons of the Little Museum include Dublin City Council, the Department of Culture, Heritage and the Gaeltacht, the Matheson Foundation, and The Ireland Funds.

Recognition
In 2012, the Little Museum of Dublin was nominated for the European Museum of the Year Award.

An Irish Times article of May 2013 listed the Little Museum as the "best museum experience in Dublin". In 2014, TripAdvisor awarded the museum with a Certificate of Excellence for the third year in a row. In February 2014 the museum won a "David Manley Emerging Entrepreneur Award" in the Arts category. As of 2022, The Little Museum was ranked #4 on TripAdvisor's "things to do in Dublin".

Other programs 
In June 2011, the Little Museum launched an initiative called "City of a Thousand Welcomes". The goal of this initiative was to show the "warmth of local Dubliners" to visitors to the city, by connecting first-time visitors to Dublin with hospitable locals. Over 1,000 such local "ambassadors" were sought to advise visitors on "underestimated" attractions in Dublin, and included historians, teachers, writers and other ordinary city residents. As of 2021, as part of the response to the COVID-19 pandemic in Ireland, this initiative was not active.

Gallery

References

External links

The Little Museum of Dublin at Google Cultural Institute

Museums in Dublin (city)
History museums in the Republic of Ireland
Art museums and galleries in the Republic of Ireland
Dublin
St Stephen's Green
2011 establishments in Ireland
Museums established in 2011